"Love Take Over" is a 1985 hit single by British pop group Five Star. The single was written and produced by Rob Van Schaick and Bernard Oates (a.k.a. The Limit). "Love Take Over" was a UK Top 30 success, peaking at #25 and also at #9 in the Hot R&B/Hip-Hop Songs chart.

Track listings
7" single and 7" picture disc:

1. Love Take Over

2. Keep in Touch

12" single:  PT40354

1. Love Take Over (Extended Version) 6:06

2. Keep in Touch

3. Let Me Be The One (Instrumental Version) aka Long Hot Soulful Summer Mix

12" single:  PT40354(R)

1. Love Take Over (The Limit Edition Mix) 6:20

2. Love Take Over (Dub Take Over) 7:03

3. Keep in Touch

4. Let Me Be The One (Instrumental Version) aka Long Hot Soulful Summer Mix

 U.S. 12" single:  JW-14324 (PW-14324)

1. Love Take Over (The Limit Edition Mix) 6:20

2. Love Take Over (The Limit Edition Mix – Edit) 4:29

3. Love Take Over (Dub Take Over) 7:03

All tracks available on the remastered versions of either the 2010 'Luxury Of Life' album, the 2013 'The Remix Anthology (The Remixes 1984-1991)' or the 2018 'Luxury - The Definitive Anthology 1984-1991' boxset.

References

Five Star songs
1985 singles
1985 songs
RCA Records singles